Asif Ali (born 4 February 1986) is an Indian actor and producer, who predominantly works in the Malayalam film industry. He started his film career with Shyamaprasad's 2009 Malayalam Language film, Ritu. 

During the subsequent years Asif went on to act in critically and commercially successful films including the romantic thriller, Apoorvaragam, the road thriller film Traffic, the romantic comedy film Salt N' Pepper and the period drama movie Ozhimuri, which got an official selection in the Indian Panorama section of the 43rd International Film Festival of India. His 2013 film Honey Bee was one of the major hits in that year and his 2015 film Nirnayakam won the National Film Award for Best Film on Other Social Issues. His success streak continued by starring in the 2016 romantic movie Anuraga Karikkin Vellam, the 2017 movie Sunday Holiday, the campus thriller Btech (2018) and Vijay Superum Pournamiyum (2019), which produced a hat-trick of hits for him with Jis Joy.

He made his debut as a producer in the 2015 film Kohinoor under his production company Adam's World of Imagination, which went on to be a success. Later he produced the 2016 film Kavi Uddeshichath and distributed various films including Vimaanam and Iblis.

Early life and family
Asif Ali was born in Karikode, Thodupuzha, Idukki, India on 4 February 1986. He obtained graduation degree from the Marian College, Kuttikkanam in Business Administration. While studying Ali modelled for ads and worked as a video jockey.

Personal life
Asif married Zama Mazrin in 2013. They have two children.

Acting career
He was selected by Shyamaprasad to play one of the lead roles in his film Ritu and received positive reviews from critics and audiences. He was then approached by Sathyan Anthikkad to play an important role in his film Kadha Thudarunnu. His third film was Apoorvaragam, directed by Sibi Malayil.

Since then, he had acted in the films Best of Luck and  Traffic. His next film was Ithu Nammude Katha written and directed by Rajesh Kannankara. In 2011 Ali signed to appear in Aashiq Abu's second movie Salt N' Pepper in which he played the role of Manu Raghav, a carefree youngster character who often puts himself into awkward situations trying to be over friendly.

He played cameo roles in Doctor Love, Indian Rupee, Mallu Singh and Ustad Hotel. In 2013 he appeared In Jean Paul Lal's directorial debut, Honey Bee where he played the role of Sebastian which he followed with debutant Jis Joy's Bicycle Thieves. Ali sang four lines of the song "Aayiram Kannumaai", which was originally featured in Fazil's Nokkethadhoorathu Kannum Nattu.His next releases were Pakida, Mosayile Kuthira Meenukal and Hi I'm Tony.  He played the role of Shabab in Sapthamashree Thaskaraha and had a cameo role in Vellimoonga.

In 2015 he appeared In Nirnayakam, Kohinoor and Rajamma @ Yahoo. His movie Anuraga Karikkin Vellam went on to become one of the Superhit of 2016. He reunited with Jean Paul Lal for Honey Bee 2. Sequel of 2013 Box office success Honey Bee. Then he appeared in Mahesh Naryanan's
Take Off. The film was shot in various parts of Dubai and released to widespread critical acclaim. In 2018, his major releases were  B Tech,  Iblis and Mandharam. B Tech became a financial success, running for 100 days in Kerala.

He started the year 2019 with Vijay Superum Pournamiyum, which became a successful venture at box office. He played a critical role in the movie Uyare, which had Parvathy and Tovino Thomas playing other characters. He played another critical role in the film Virus,  based on a true story that occurred in Calicut. He later acted in Nissam Basheer's directorial debut Kettyolaanu Ente Malakha, which was a box office success and gained critical acclaim. Director Lal Jose appraised it to be his career's best.

In 2021 His Major Releases were Ellam Sheriyakum and Kunjeldho.

Filmography

As an actor

As producer

As playback singer

Television

Awards and nominations

References

External links

Living people
21st-century Indian male actors
Indian male film actors
Indian male voice actors
Male actors from Kerala
Male actors in Malayalam cinema
People from Idukki district
1986 births
Film producers from Kerala
Malayalam film producers